Schönwald may refer to:

Schönwald im Schwarzwald, Baden-Württemberg, Germany
Schönwald, Bavaria, Germany
Schönwald, Brandenburg (also Schönwalde), Germany
 German name of Krásný Les (Karlovy Vary District), Czech Republic
 German name of Šumvald, Czech Republic

See also 
Schonwald
Schönwalde (disambiguation)
Schönewalde, town in the Elbe-Elster district, in southwestern Brandenburg, Germany